Marissa Township is located in St. Clair County, Illinois. As of the 2010 census, its population was 2,468 and it contained 1,175 housing units.

Geography

Demographics

References

External links
City-data.com
St. Clair County Official Site
Illinois State Archives

Townships in St. Clair County, Illinois
Townships in Illinois